Keetonville is an unincorporated community in Rogers County, Oklahoma, United States.

References

Unincorporated communities in Rogers County, Oklahoma
Unincorporated communities in Oklahoma